Ladignac-le-Long is a commune in the Haute-Vienne department in the Nouvelle-Aquitaine region in west-central France.

Inhabitants are known as Ladignacois in French.

See also
Communes of the Haute-Vienne department

References

External links
Web site

Communes of Haute-Vienne